This is a list of spaceflights launched between July and December 1991. For launches between January and June, see 1991 in spaceflight (January–June). For an overview of the whole year, see 1991 in spaceflight.

Launches

|colspan=8|

July
|-

|colspan=8|

August
|-

|colspan=8|

September
|-

|colspan=8|

October
|-

|colspan=8|

November
|-

|colspan=8|

December
|-

|}

References

Footnotes

(July-December), 1991 in Spaceflight
Spaceflight by year